Harihar Vaman Deshpande (5 March 1905 – 20 April 1965) was born in Chandkapur (Amravati) Bombaby Presidency, India.

Biography

Education

Harihar Vaman Deshpande completed his high school education from Government Hindu High School at Amravati, where he appeared for his 10th standard in 1921. In 1918, he joined Hanuman Vayayam Prasarak Mandal, Amravati, where he was trained in wrestling and other traditional sports.

Social and political impact 
While at H.V.P.M, he was influenced by the social and political ideology being practiced in the institute by the founders Anant Krishna and Ambadas Krishna Vaidya, under the leadership of a renowned patriot of Vidarbha, Veer Vamanrao Joshi. He boycotted high school education and joined the non-cooperation movement of Mahatma Gandhi, which had been initiated in Vidarbha by Veer Vamanrao Joshi. In 1921, he joined his batch mates to boycott classed and campaign heavily in rural areas in order to raise awareness of the N.C. Movement. He joined the ‘Rashtriya Mahavidyalaya’ at Amalner (part of Dhulia district) and completed his education in 1922.

He got qualified in the entrance examination of ‘Tilak Maharashtra Vidyapeeth’ Pune (1923–25) and was graduated with a Degree B.A. (Tilak) – "Wangmaya Visharad". Swami Ramanand Tirth and H.R. Mahajani were his batchmates, and their friendship continued long outside of the classroom. In 1926, he worked as a teacher at ‘Rashtriya Vidyalaya’ Akot District. Akola. He then worked for H.V.P. Mandal in 1927 and participate in its activities. He was subsequently deputed to West Bengal and Uttar Pradesh as a propagandist of physical culture and for conducting physical training camps at several places on the initiative of "Hindu Maha Sabha"of Calcutta (1928).

While at Gorakhpur in U.P. during such a camp Shivram Hari Rajguru (Compatriot of Sardar Bhagat Singh) visited the camp and met H.V.Deshpande and Dnyaneshwar Deshpande – both of them were close friends of Rajguru at H.V.P.M. (Rajguru was student at H.V.P.M. in 1927). During his stay in U.P. for the camps he came in contact with national leaders like Pt. Madan Mohan Malviya and Lal Bahadur Shastri, who were associated and active in the working of Hindu Maha Sabha. In 1929 he, along with his two colleagues, namely T.G. Joshi and V.B. alias Babasaheb Vaidya, went to Lahore to attend All India Session of Indian National Congress.

For his active involvement in the non-cooperation movement during 1929 and 1930, he was arrested and sentenced to jail in 1930 for a year. Again in 1932 he was arrested and imprisoned for rigorous punishment by British Government. Soon after his release from jail,  he got involved in organizing Berar Youth League and its conferences (1933-34). He actively helped in conducting All-India Training Camp of "Hindustani Seva Dal" at Borivali (Mumbai) in 1931. He also organized 22 Taluka Congress Committee in Vidarbha Region (1931) and was elected as a Secretary of ‘Vidarbha Pradesh Congress Committee’ and member of All-India Congress Committee (AICC) - 1930-34. He helped to and organized the  Provincial and All India Conferences for supporting Registration Bill of Ayurvedic Practitioners - 1937-39. He also recruited and conducted Training Camp for 3000 volunteers from Madhya Pradesh and Mahakoshal with his colleagues on behalf of H.V.P.Mandal (HVPM) for service during the All India Session of AICC (All India Congress Committee) at Tripuri (Jabalpur) held in 1939. He was appointed Chief Organizer of the Volunteers Corps. He came in contact with various national leaders like Pt. Jawaharlal Nehru and Subhash Chandra Bose.

He organized a 150-member team of HVPM  members to participate in the Golden Jubilee of Indian National Congress held at Govalia Tank Maidan, Mumbai in 1937. Prior to Mumbai, the team had its display of traditional physical activities at Baroda and Surat where Maharaja Sayajirao Gaikwad and Sardar Vallabha Bhai Patel respectively presided over the program.

During the period 1940-42, he was actively involved in 'Quit India Movement' for which he was again arrested and jailed for more than six months.

Government service 

He was appointed and served as Liaison & Welfare Officer in Home Guard Department of the Ex-M.P.Government from 1947 to 1956.  He subsequently, served on the said post in the same Department of the Maharashtra Government  between 1956 and 1960.

International contacts 
Deshpande visited several countries as chief organizer of the Indian Lingiad Team. Deshpande  developed contacts with physical education experts, sports persons, and institutions in Germany, Sweden, Denmark, England, and Switzerland.

Resignation and afterward
Life through 1960–65:

He resigned from Government service in 1960 and accepted the post of Managing Editor of "Aarogya Mandir" for the monthly magazine of Panvel. He began publishing a magazine from Amravati (1960–63).

Subsequent to the closure of publication by the management, he turned towards Gandhi Smarak Nidhi as Organizer of the Gandhi Study Centre at Amravati where he was instrumental in setting up a library (1961–64) for the general public and organized periodical lectures on Gandhian ideology and allied topics.

Death:

Towards the end of 1964, he developed health problems and he was subsequently hospitalized at Govt. Medical College Hospital where he died on 20 April 1965.

Other works

Political 

 Boycotted Government Education and worked for the non- cooperation movement of 1921.
 Graduated from the National Tilak University of Poona and also studied Ayuraveda. The degree is recognized as equivalent to B.A for service purposes.
 Elected Secretary of the Vidarbha Pradesh Congress Committee and member of the A.I.C.C. 1930-34.
 Organized Civil Disobedience movements and was imprisoned in 1930, 1932 and 1942.

Organizational 
Organized the Berar Youth League and its Conferences 1927-34.
 Organized and conducted camps of Physical Training in U.P. And Punjab- 1928-30.
 Helped actively in conducting All India Training Camp of Hindustani Seva Dal at Borivali (Bombay) in 1931.
 Organized 22 Taluka Congress Committee- 1931.
 Organized and help provincial and All India Conferences for supporting registration bill of Ayurvedic practitioners 1937-1939.
 Served as Chief Organiser and Training Officer of the 3000 volunteers of the Pripuri session of the Indian National Congress-1939.
 Organized the first All India Physical Education Conference at Amravati- 1946.
 Served in the Home Guard Organisation of the Ex-M.P. Government from 1947 July to 1956 November and is continued in the Bombay 
Governments Liaison and Welfare officer of Home Guards for Vidarbha.
 Organized the "Know Your Home Guards Exhibition" under ex- M.P. Government-1952.

Social service 
He served mainly in the fields of 
 life-saving
 medical aid
 organizing anti-epidemic measures
 relief work
 village uplift and social welfare. It was spread over a period from 1934-56.

Extended voluntary services to:
National Association of Physical Education & Recreation
Hanuman Vyayam Prasarak Mandal Amravati
Nagpur University Board of Physical Education & Recreation.
Maharashtra Sharirik Shikshan Parishad.
Maharashtra Ayurved Parishad Pune.
Funds collection: Small and big amounts of fund as had to be collected from time to time for several purpose.

Published works
The List of his published books:
 अवनतिमय भारतवर्ष
 दोन प्रख्यात युध्द तंन्त्रे 
 १८५७ च्या वीर महिला 
 राजपुत राज्यांचा उदय व ऱ्हास
 राजपूत संस्कृती 
 शिखांचा शत संवत्सारिक इतिहास

See also
 Physical Education

References

External links
 
 hvpm.org

People from Maharashtra
People from Amravati
Physical education
1905 births
1965 deaths